Silvia La Barbera (born 27 August 1984) is an Italian female long-distance runner who competed at individual senior level at the IAAF World Half Marathon Championships and at the IAAF World Cross Country Championships (2005).

Biografia
La Barbera won a bronze medal in 5000 metres at the 2005 European Athletics U23 Championships and gold medal at under-20 lve two years before at the 2003 European Athletics Junior Championships.

National titles
She won a national championships at individual senior level.
Italian Cross Country Championships
Long race: 2016

References

External links
 

1984 births
Living people
Italian female long-distance runners
Italian female cross country runners
Athletics competitors of Gruppo Sportivo Forestale
Athletics competitors of Centro Sportivo Carabinieri
People from Altofonte
Sportspeople from the Province of Palermo